The Metropolitan Opera Gala 1991 was a four-hour concert staged by the Metropolitan Opera on 23 September 1991 to celebrate the 25th anniversary of its opening night in its second home at Lincoln Center. It was televised by Cablevision, and issued by Deutsche Grammophon on Laserdisc and VHS videocassette in 1992 and on DVD in 2010.

Background
Originally based in a theatre on the junction of Broadway and 39th Street in New York City, the Metropolitan Opera began performing in its second home at Lincoln Center in 1966, starting the second phase of its life with the première of an opera commissioned for the occasion, Samuel Barber's Antony and Cleopatra. The Met celebrated the silver anniversary of that event with a gala that lasted for some four hours.

The event began with Luciano Pavarotti, Nicolai Ghiaurov, Leo Nucci, Cheryl Studer and Birgitta Svendén in the last act of Otto Schenk's production of Rigoletto, a staging in which Pavarotti had appeared at its first outing two years earlier. Plácido Domingo, Charles Anthony, Dwayne Croft, Justino Díaz, Mirella Freni and Paul Plishka followed in the third act of Franco Zeffirelli's production of Otello. Hermann Prey, Croft, Barbara Daniels, Andrij Dobriansky and Anne Sofie von Otter concluded the gala in a performance of an abridged version of the second act of Schenk's production of Die Fledermaus, deploying the theatre's revolving stage and incorporating eleven items sung by guests at Prince Orlofsky's party.

The original stage productions were supported by the Gramma Fisher Foundation of Marshalltown, Iowa, with supplementary help from Mr and Mrs Paul M. Montrone for Rigoletto, from Mrs John D. Rockefeller for Otello and from Mrs Donald D. Harrington for Die Fledermaus. The revival of Rigoletto was supported by the Edith C. Blum Foundation. The television broadcast of the gala was supported by the Texaco Philanthropic Foundation, Inc., the National Endowment For the Arts and the Charles E. Culpeper Foundation. The gala was jointly produced by the Metropolitan Opera, Cablevision, NBC, PolyGram and MAX Japan.

DVD chapter listing

DVD 1
 1 (3:06) Before the performance: a glimpse behind the scenes
 2 (1:24) The National Anthem
Giuseppe Verdi (1813-1901)

Rigoletto (Venice, 1851), with a libretto by Francesco Maria Piave (1810-1876), after Le roi s'amuse ("The king amuses himself", Paris, 1832) by Victor Hugo (1802–1885).

Presented in a stage production by Otto Schenk (b. 1930), with set and costume design by Zack Brown, lighting design by Gil Wechsler and stage direction by Sharon Thomas. Featuring Luciano Pavarotti as the Duke of Mantua, Cheryl Studer as Gilda, the Duke's daughter, Leo Nucci as Rigoletto, the Duke's court jester, Nicolai Ghiaurov as Sparafucile, a brigand, and Birgitta Svendén as Maddalena, Sparafucile's daughter.
 
Act Three
 3 (2:43) "E l'ami?" - "Sempre" (Rigoletto, Gilda, Duke, Sparafucile)
 4 (3:06) "La donna è mobile" (Duke, Sparafucile, Rigoletto)
 5 (1:33) "Un dì, se ben rammentomi" (Duke, Gilda, Maddalena, Rigoletto)
 6 (4:27) "Bella figlia dell'amore" (Duke, Maddalena, Gilda, Rigoletto)
 7 (4:08) "M'odi! Ritorna a casa" (Rigoletto, Gilda, Sparafucile, Duke, Maddalena)
 8 (5:58) "È amabile invero tal giovinotto" (Maddalena, Sparafucile, Gilda)
 9 (4:33) "Della vendetta alfin giunge l'istante!" (Rigoletto, Sparafucile, Duke)
10 (1:42) "Chi è mai, chi è qui in sua vece?" (Rigoletto, Gilda)
11 (7:42) "V'ho ingannato... Colpevole fui" (Gilda, Rigoletto)
Giuseppe Verdi

Otello (Milan, 1887), with a libretto by Arrigo Boito (1842-1918), after The Tragedy of Othello, the Moor of Venice (?1603) by William Shakespeare (1564-1616).

Presented in a stage production and set designed by Franco Zeffirelli (1923-2019), with costume design by Peter J. Hall (1926-2010), lighting design by Gil Wechsler and stage direction by Fabrizio Melano. Featuring Plácido Domingo as Otello, a Moor, commander-in-chief of the Venetian fleet, Mirella Freni as Desedemona, Otello's wife, Justino Díaz as Iago, an ensign, Sondra Kelly as Emilia, Iago's wife, Uwe Heilmann as Cassio, a platoon leader, Paul Plishka as Lodovico, ambassador of the Venetian republic, Charles Anthony as Roderigo, a Venetian gentleman, and Dwayne Croft as a herald.

Act Three
12 (3:11) "La vedetta del porto ha segnelato" (A herald, Otello, Iago)
13 (4:54) "Dio ti giocondi, o sposo" (Desdemona, Otello)
14 (5:34) "Esterrefatta fisso" (Desdemona, Otello)
15 (4:09) "Dio! Mi potevi scagliar tutti i mali" (Otello, Iago)
16 (5:22) "Vieni, l'aula è deserta" (Iago, Cassio, Otello)
17 (1:47) "Come l'ucciderò?" (Otello, Iago, Chorus)
18 (2:57) "Il doge ed il senato salutano l'eroe" (Lodovico, Otello, Desdemona, Emilia, Iago, Roderigo, Cassio, Chorus)
19 (1:52) "Messeri! Il doge..." (Otello, Roderigo, Iago, Cassio, Lodovico)
20 (6:08) "A terra! Sì, nel livido fango" (Desdemona, Emilia, Cassio, Roderigo, Lodovico, Chorus, Iago)
21 (5:49) "Fuggite! Tutti fuggite Otello!" (Otello, Chorus, Iago)

DVD 2
Johann Strauss II (1825-1899)

Die Fledermaus ("The flittermouse", Vienna, 1874), with a libretto by Karl Haffner (1804-1876) and Richard Genée (1823-1895), after Le réveillon ("The supper party", Paris, 1872) by Henri Meilhac (1830-1897) and Ludovic Halévy (1839-1908), after Das Gefängnis ("The prison", Berlin, 1851) by Julius Roderich Benedix (1811-1873), and with dialogue by Paul Mills adapted from that written by Otto Schenk and translated by Marcel Prawy (1911-2003).

Presented in a stage production by Otto Schenk, with set design by Günther Schneider-Siemssen (1926-2015), costume design by Peter J. Hall, lighting design by Gil Wechsler and stage direction by Paul Mills. Featuring Hermann Prey as Gabriel von Eisenstein, a wealthy gentleman of leisure, Barbara Daniels as Rosalinde, Eisenstein's wife, Barbara Kilduff as Adele, Rosalinde's chambermaid, Grace Millo as Ida, Adele's sister, Anne Sofie von Otter as Prince Orlofsky, a wealthy Russian, Andrij Dobriansky as Ivan, Orlofsky's servant, Dwayne Croft as Dr Falke, a notary, and Gottfried Hornik as Frank, a prison governor.

Act Two
 1 (2:39) "Ein Souper heut uns winkt" (Chorus)
 2 (2:11) Dialogue
 3 (2:53) "Ich lade gern mir Gäste ein" (Orlofsky)
 4 (0:39) Dialogue
 5 (1:07) "Ach, meine Herr'n und Damen" (Orlofsky, Falke, Adele, Eisenstein, Chorus)
 6 (3:40) Adele's Laughing Song: "Mein Herr Marquis" (Adele, ensemble)
 7 (3:28) Dialogue
 8 (4:36) Watch duet: "Dieser Anstand, so manierlich" (Eisenstein, Rosalinde)
 9 (1:06) Dialogue
10 (5:04) Csárdás: "Klänge der Heimat" (Rosalinde)
11 (1:37) Dialogue

Party guests' sequence

Wolfgang Amadeus Mozart (1756-1791)

Die Zauberflöte ("The magic flute", K. 620, Vienna, 1791), with a libretto by Emmanuel Schikaneder (1751-1812)
12 (5:58) Aria (Papageno): "Ein Mädchen oder Weibchen" (Hermann Prey)
Jacques Offenbach (1819-1880)

La Grande-Duchesse de Gérolstein (Paris, 1887), with a libretto by Henri Meilhac and Ludovic Halévy
13 (4:53) Aria (La Grande-Duchesse): "Ah! Que j'aime les militaires" (Frederica von Stade)
Gioachino Rossini (1792-1868)

Il barbiere di Siviglia, ossia L'inutile precauzione ("The barber of Seville, or The useless precaution", Rome, 1816), with a libretto by Cesare Sterbini (1784-1831), after Le barbier de Séville (Paris, 1775) by Pierre Beaumarchais (1732-1799)
14 (5:19) Aria (Figaro): "Largo al factotum" (Thomas Hampson)
Ambroise Thomas (1811-1896)

Mignon (Paris, 1866), with a libretto by Jules Barbier (1825-1901) and Michel Carré (1821-1872), after Wilhelm Meisters Lehrjahre ("Wilhelm Meister's Apprenticeship", 1795-1796) by Johann Wolfgang von Goethe (1749-1832)
15 (6:52) Aria (Philine): "Je suis Titania" (June Anderson)
Leonard Bernstein (1918-1990)

West Side Story (New York City, 1957), with a book by Arthur Laurents (1917-2011) and lyrics by Stephen Sondheim (b. 1930), after Romeo and Juliet (circa 1595-1597) by William Shakespeare
16 (3:28) Song (Tony): "Maria" (Sherrill Milnes)
Umberto Giordano (1867-1948)

Andrea Chénier (Milan, 1896), with a libretto by Luigi Illica (1857-1919), based on the life of André Chénier (1762-1794)
17 (6:55) Aria (Maddalena): "La mamma morta" (Aprile Millo)
Wolfgang Amadeus Mozart

Il dissoluto punito, ossia Il Don Giovanni ("The rake punished, or Don Giovanni", K. 527, Prague, 1787), with a libretto by Lorenzo da Ponte (1749-1838), after El burlador de Seville y convivado de piedra ("The trickster of Seville and the stone guest", ?1616) by Tirso de Molina (1579-1648)
18 (6:10) Catalogue aria (Leporello): "Madamina, il catalogo è questo" (Ferruccio Furlanetto)
Gaetano Donizetti (1797-1848)

Linda di Chamounix (Vienna, 1842), with a libretto by Gaetano Rossi (1774-1855)
19 (7:31) Aria (Linda): "O luce di quest'anima" (Kathleen Battle)
Mitch Leigh (1928-2014)

Man of La Mancha (New York City, 1965), with a book by Dale Wasserman (1914-2008) and lyrics by Joe Darion (1917-2001), after Wasserman's teleplay I, Don Quixote (1959), after El ingenioso hidalgo Don Quijote de la Mancha ("The ingenious gentleman Don Quixote of La Mancha", 1605-1615) by Miguel de Cervantes (1547-1616)
20 (4:23) Song (Don Quixote): "The impossible dream" (Samuel Ramey)
Francesco Cilea (1866-1950)

Adriana Lecouvreur (Milan, 1902), with a libretto by Arturo Colautti (1851-1914), after Adrienne Lecouvreur (1849) by Eugène Scribe (1791-1861) and Ernest Legouvé (1807-1903)
21 (5:25) Aria (Adriana): "Io son l'umile ancella" (Mirella Freni)
Giacomo Puccini (1858-1924)

La Bohème ("The Bohemian", Turin, 1896), with a libretto by Luigi Illica and Giuseppe Giacosa (1847-1906), after Scènes de la vie de bohème ("Scenes of Bohemian life", 1851) by Henri Murger (1822-1861)
22 (6:45) Duet (Marcello and Rodolfo): "In un coupé?... O Mimi, tu più non torni" (Luciano Pavarotti and Plácido Domingo)
Johann Strauss II

Die Fledermaus (resumed)
23 (4:20) Champagne song: "Champagner hats verschuldet" (All)
24 (0:26) Closing credits

Personnel

Artists

 June Anderson (b. 1952), soprano
 Charles Anthony (1929-2012), tenor
 Kathleen Battle (b. 1948), soprano
 Dwayne Croft, baritone
 Barbara Daniels, soprano
 Justino Díaz (b. 1940), bass-baritone
 Andrij Dobriansky (1930-2012), bass-baritone
 Plácido Domingo (b. 1941), tenor
 Mirella Freni (1935-2020), soprano
 Ferruccio Furlanetto (b. 1949), bass
 Nicolai Ghiaurov (1929-2004), bass
 Thomas Hampson (b. 1955), baritone
 Uwe Heilmann (b. 1960), tenor
 Gottfried Hornik (b. 1940), baritone
 Sondra Kelly, mezzo-soprano
 Barbara Kilduff, soprano
 Aprile Millo (b. 1958), soprano
 Grace Millo, soprano
 Sherrill Milnes (b. 1935), baritone
 Leo Nucci (b. 1942), baritone
 Anne Sofie von Otter (b. 1955), mezzo-soprano
 Luciano Pavarotti (1935-2007), tenor
 Paul Plishka (b. 1941), bass
 Hermann Prey (1929-1998), baritone
 Samuel Ramey (b. 1942), bass
 Frederica von Stade (b. 1945), mezzo-soprano
 Cheryl Studer (b. 1955), soprano
 Birgitta Svendén (b. 1952), mezzo-soprano
 Metropolitan Opera Ballet
 Diana Levy, ballet mistress
 Metropolitan Opera Chorus
 Raymond Hughes, chorus master
 Gildo di Nunzio, stage band conductor (Otello)
 Metropolitan Opera Orchestra
 Raymond Gniewek (b. 1931), concertmaster
 James Levine (1943–2021), conductor

Metropolitan Opera personnel

 Joan Dornemann, musical preparation
 Jane Klaviter, musical preparation and prompter
 David Kneuss, executive stage manager
 Stephen A. Brown, stage manager
 Thomas H. Connell III, stage manager
 Gary Dietrich, stage manager
 William McCourt, stage manager
 Raymond Menard, stage manager
 Scott Moon, stage manager
 Stephen Diaz, master carpenter
 Sander Hacker, master electrician
 Edward McConway, properties master
 Magda Szayer, wig and hair stylist
 Victor Callegari, make-up artist
 Millicent Hacker, wardrobe mistress
 Richard Wagner, costume shop head

Broadcast personnel

 Peter Gelb (b. 1953), executive producer
 Brian Large (b. 1939), director
 Joseph Angotti, producer
 Louisa Briccetti, producer
 Daniel Anker, coordination producer
 Suzanne Gooch, associate producer
 Carol Stowe, associate director
 Mark Schubin, engineer-in-charge
 Jay David Saks, audio producer
 Alan Adelman, lighting design
 Tony Pascento, lighting associate
 Ron Washburn, senior technician
 Emmett Loughran, technical director
 Bill King, audio supervisor
 Mel Becker, audio engineer
 Tom Carroll, audio engineer
 Paul Cohen, audio engineer
 Louise de la Fuente, audio engineer
 Jim Jordan, audio engineer
 Kathleen King, audio engineer
 Larry Loewinger, audio engineer
 Peter Miller, audio engineer
 Blake Norton, audio engineer
 Bruce Shapiro, audio engineer
 Michael Shoskes, audio engineer
 Suzanne Sousa, audio engineer
 Robert M. Tannenbaum, audio engineer
 Elaine Warner, audio engineer
 Susan Noll, video engineer
 Matty Randazzo, video engineer
 Paul Ranieri, video engineer
 William Steinberg, video engineer
 William Akerlund, camera operator
 Miguel Armstrong, camera operator
 Juan Barrera, camera operator
 Jim Covello, camera operator
 John Feher, camera operator
 Manny Gutierrez, camera operator
 Charlie Huntley, camera operator
 Tom Hurwitz, camera operator
 Don Lenzer, camera operator
 Mike Lieberman, camera operator
 Ed Marritz, camera operator
 Alain Onesto, camera operator
 Jake Ostroff, camera operator
 Bob Richman, camera operator
 David Smith, camera operator
 Larry Solomon, camera operator
 Alan Buchner, videotape engineer
 Jack Roche, videotape engineer
 Barry Fialk, Chyron engineer
 Bruce Balton, crane technician
 Rob Balton, crane technician
 Ernie Jew, remote camera technician
 Terence Benson, television stage manager
 Margi Kerns, television stage manager
 Uwe Lehmann, television stage manager
 Hank Niemark, television stage manager
 James O'Gorman, television stage manager
 Karen McLaughlin, music associate
 Susan Erben, producer's assistant
 Rae M. Cazzola, production secretary
 Juan Pablo Gamboa, production assistant
 Jessica Ruskin, production assistant
 Olga Losada, camera script
 Peter Dahlstrom, Unitel mobile video
 Dan Doolan, Unitel mobile video
 Michael R. Jones, Unitel mobile video
 Phil Gitomer, remote recording services
 David Hewitt, remote recording services
 Vin Gizzi, audio post-production
 Gary Bradley, editor
 Pat Jaffe, opening segment producer
 Susan Greene, executive in charge

DVD production personnel

 Burkhard Bartsch, project manager
 Veronika Holek, project coordinator
 Harald Gericke, producer, Platin Media Productions, Langenhagen
 Daniel Kemper, authoring, encoding and AMSI surround sound engineer, Platin Media Productions
 Michaela Jürgens, screen design, Platin Media Productions
 Monica Ling, subtitles
 Eva Reisinger, booklet editor, Texthouse
 Merle Kersten, art direction, Texthouse

Critical reception

Reviews
Edward Rothstein reviewed the gala in The New York Times on 25 September 1991. The Met's first night at Lincoln Center, he recalled, had been an utter catastrophe, and the gala celebrating its silver anniversary in its second theatre had begun with disappointments just as discouraging as those of the première of Barber's Antony and Cleopatra in 1966.

The third act of Rigoletto began the concert with "a nearly funereal mood, and not quite the one anybody had in mind". Luciano Pavarotti's "groping make-out scene" with the injudiciously cast Birgitta Svendén was unfortunate, and his singing did not show him at his best. His voice sounded constricted, and a histrionic laugh could not conceal that a climactic note had cracked. An excerpt "drained of human characters, offering pasteboard roles and posing voices" was partly redeemed by the force and personality of Nicolai Ghiaurov as Sparafucile.

Matters improved with the third act of Otello, but only marginally. Justino Díaz was "curiously insubstantial" as Iago, and Plácido Domingo "stolid" as the Moor of Venice. Mirella Freni exhibited her ability to sing high notes very loudly. Conducting, James Levine "seemed to treat the music as a collection of fragments designed for glitter and response ... belting out exclamations with little thought for proportion and sense and drama". One began to question whether the idea of turning bleeding chunks of operas into showcases for celebrities might not be essentially misconceived.

But the feeling of the evening lifted abruptly with the second act of Die Fledermaus. Hermann Prey's "winsome" Eisenstein and Barbara Daniels's "brash" Rosalinde introduced "a party that became a triumphant homage to the powers of the voice", as the tradition of interpolating guest appearances into Orlofsky's festivity was honoured in "one of the most exquisitely refined and extravagant assemblages of vocal artistry" in the Met's entire 108-year history.

Hermann Prey evoked memories of his 1966 Met Papageno with an aria that brought the bird-catcher to life with expressive artlessness. Thomas Hampson won an overwhelming ovation with the energy, accuracy and supernatural acting of his "Largo al factotum". Kathleen Battle combined delicately engraved phrasing and a tone of sensuous velvet in "O luce di quest'anima". Frederica von Stade was charming and kindly in "Ah! Que j'aime les militaires". Broadway was acknowledged by Sherrill Milnes in "Maria" and by Samuel Ramey in "The impossible dream". Ferruccio Furlanetto, currently starring at the Met as Don Giovanni, contributed Leporello's catalogue of his master's conquests.

June Anderson was immaculate and celestial in "Je suis Titania". Aprile Millo was suitably overcome by emotion in "La mamma morta". Mirella Freni was forcefully eloquent in "Io son l'umile ancella". And Pavarotti and Domingo joined forces in a duet from La Bohème, "clowning with scarves, clasping shoulders and hands and showing a subtle but good-hearted rivalry in their singing and bows".

All in all, despite its moments of strain and its lapses into vanity, the gala was "a grand-scale tribute to a great opera company", and one was left admiring the gifts of the evening's soloists and Levine's manifest affection for them.

The gala was also reviewed by Martin Bernheimer in The Los Angeles Times, by Peter G. Davis in New York Magazine and by Tim Page in Newsday. It was also discussed in Opera News, Opernwelt, Stereo Review and in Dantia Gould's The pay-per-view explosion (1991).

Accolades
The gala was recognized three times in the Primetime Emmy Awards for 1992. Brian Large won an award for Outstanding Individual Achievement - Classical Music/Dance Programming - Directing, and Plácido Domingo and Kathleen Battle both won awards for Outstanding Individual Achievement - Classical Music/Dance Programming - Performance.

Broadcast and home media history
The gala was broadcast live on Cablevision pay-per-view television on 23 September 1991.

Deutsche Grammophon issued the gala in several formats, all with 4:3 NTSC colour video: a 181-minute pair of CLV (constant linear velocity) Laserdiscs (catalogue number 072-528-1) released in 1992, a 167-minute VHS videocassette (catalogue number 072-528-3) also released in 1992 and a 179-minute  pair of Region 0 DVDs (catalogue number 00440-073-4582) released in 2010. The DVDs have audio in both lossless PCM stereo and an ersatz 5.1 channel DTS surround sound upmix synthesized with the AMSI II (Ambient Surround Imaging) technology created by Emil Berliner Studios. They have subtitles in Chinese, English, French, German and Spanish, and - although only for items sung in that language - Italian, and are accompanied by a 24-page booklet with four photographs and an essay by Richard Evidon in English, French and German.

Gallery of artists

See also
 The Metropolitan Opera Centennial Gala
 James Levine's 25th Anniversary Metropolitan Opera Gala

References

1991 classical albums
1991 television films
1991 films
Classical video albums
Deutsche Grammophon albums
Events in New York City
Live classical albums
Metropolitan Opera
Opera recordings